Düngen may refer to a pair of villages in Lower Saxony, Germany:

Groß Düngen, in Bad Salzdetfurth
Klein Düngen, in Bad Salzdetfurth